Khadijeh Azadpour is an Iranian wushu athlete and World championship Gold medal (2009, 2010) and Asian Games Gold medal 2010.

Honours

National 

 Sanda World Cup
 Gold: 2009, Toronto
Gold: 2010, Shanghai
 Sanda Asian Games
 Gold: 2010, Guangzhou

Personal 

 Iranian Women's Wushu League (Stars Cup)
 1st place: 2008
 1st place: 2009

Wushu at the 2010 Asian Games 
In Wushu at the 2010 Asian Games – Women's sanda 60 kg Khadijeh Azadpour from Iran won the gold medal after beating W. Sandhyarani Devi of India in gold medal bout 2–0. Azadpour became the first Iranian female to win an Asian Games gold medal in an individual event.

References
3. Female Athlete To Receive Reward For Gold Medal 'Only If Married' (in Persian).

4. فروش دو میلیاردی مدال "خدیجه آزادپور" برای زلزله‌زدگان کرمانشاه (in Persian). 

5. خدیجه آزادپور اولین بانوی طلایی ایران در بازی های آسیایی (in Persian). 

6. خدیجه آزادپور :پرقدرت برمیگردم (in Persian).

External links
Khadijeh Azadpour on Instagram 

Living people
Iranian wushu practitioners
Iranian sanshou practitioners
Asian Games gold medalists for Iran
Asian Games medalists in wushu
Wushu practitioners at the 2010 Asian Games
Medalists at the 2010 Asian Games
Year of birth missing (living people)
21st-century Iranian people